Cercospora vexans is a fungal plant pathogen.

References

External links

vexans
Fungal plant pathogens and diseases